Chimango Kayira (born 28 September 1993) is a Malawian international footballer who plays for Big Bullets, as a midfielder.

Career
Born in Mangochi, Kayira has played for ESCOM United, Big Bullets and Costa do Sol.

He made his international debut for Malawi in 2011.

References

1993 births
Living people
Malawian footballers
Malawi international footballers
ESCOM United FC players
Nyasa Big Bullets FC players
CD Costa do Sol players
Association football midfielders
Malawian expatriate footballers
Malawian expatriate sportspeople in Mozambique
Expatriate footballers in Mozambique